Australia is one of the most urbanised nations, with 90 per cent of the population living in just 0.22 per cent of the country’s land area and 85 per cent living within 50 kilometres of the coast. As at the 2016 Census, more than two-thirds of Australians lived in a capital city, with 40 per cent of the population being in the two largest cities of Sydney and Melbourne.

50 most densely populated Australian suburbs

See also
 Demographics of Australia
 Urbanization in Africa
 Urbanization in China
 Urbanization in India
 Urbanization in the United States
 Urbanization
 Urban planning in Australia
 Urbanization by country

References

Australia geography-related lists
Australia
Economy of Australia-related lists